Black Mesa may refer to:

A summit in Antarctica:
Black Mesa (Antarctica)
One of 41 summits in the United States: